Thomas Tregear Leggo (1892 – 10 June 1958) was an Australian pioneer rugby league player who played in the 1910s.

Background
Leggo was born at Sydney in 1892.  Leggo grew up in Glebe, New South Wales.

Playing career
Leggo's playing career started at Newtown in 1912. He swifted to his local team, the Glebe rugby league team in 1913 and played seven seasons with the club between 1913 and 1919. He represented Sydney(Metropolis) in 1913–1914 and represented New South Wales on five occasions between 1913 and 1914, which included a tour of New Zealand.

Leggo died on 10 June 1958, at Balgowlah, New South Wales aged 66.

References

1892 births
1958 deaths
Australian rugby league players
Glebe rugby league players
Newtown Jets players
New South Wales rugby league team players
Rugby league wingers
Date of birth missing
Rugby league players from Sydney